Playa Caribe is a beach situated a few minutes north of Juan Griego, at a small bay on the west coast of Isla Margarita. It is a fairly popular beach nearly a mile long (1200 m) with several restaurants and foodstands. Playa Caribe is an exposed beach break with moderate waves.

References

External links 
 Beaches of Margarita Island

Beaches of Venezuela
Margarita Island
Geography of Nueva Esparta